Henri François Xavier Gresley (9 February 1819, Wassy – 2 May 1890, Paris) was a French Minister of War.

References

1819 births
1890 deaths
People from Haute-Marne
French Ministers of War
French life senators
Politicians of the French Third Republic